Jasim Mohamed Abdalla (born November 24, 1988 in London) is a United Arab Emirates professional basketball player.

Club career
At the club level, Mohamed currently plays professionally for Al-Wasl of the United Arab Emirates Basketball League.

International career
Mohamed also competed for the United Arab Emirates national basketball team for the first time at the FIBA Asia Championship 2007 and has since participated in the FIBA Asia Championship 2009. Despite being only 20 years old at the 2009 tournament, he averaged 7.3 points per game and 4.7 rebounds per game in helping the UAE to a 12th-place finish, their best showing since 2001.

References

External links
Profile at realgm.com

1988 births
Living people
Emirati men's basketball players
Centers (basketball)